Tryokhgorny (lit. (a town of) three mountains) is a closed town in Chelyabinsk Oblast, Russia, located in the western part of the oblast  from Chelyabinsk. Population:

History
On January 24, 1952, the Council of Ministers of the USSR issued decree № 342—135сс/оп to build Plant #933 (Instrument Factory) for the production of atomic bombs. Konstantin Volodin headed the new plant. On April 9, 1952, first construction workers arrived to the area.

Administrative and municipal status
Within the framework of administrative divisions, it is incorporated as the Town of Tryokhgorny—an administrative unit with the status equal to that of the districts. As a municipal division, the Town of Tryokhgorny is incorporated as Tryokhgorny Urban Okrug.

Closed status
The town is closed because a plant producing nuclear weapons is located there.

References

Notes

Sources

External links
Official website of Tryokhgorny 
Tryokhgorny plant

Cities and towns in Chelyabinsk Oblast
Nuclear weapons program of the Soviet Union
Closed cities
Naukograds
Populated places established in 1952
1952 establishments in the Soviet Union